This article contains a list of fossil-bearing stratigraphic units in the state of Pennsylvania, U.S.

Sites

See also

 Paleontology in Pennsylvania

References

 

Pennsylvania
Stratigraphic units
Stratigraphy of Pennsylvania
Pennsylvania geography-related lists
United States geology-related lists